Jocelyn de Grandis (born 23 November 1980, in Besançon) is a French archer.

De Grandis competed at the 2004 Summer Olympics in men's individual archery.  Despite being ranked as number 11 beforehand, he was defeated in the first round of elimination, placing 51st overall. Later De Grandis was a member of the 10th-place French men's archery team at the 2004 Summer Olympics.

Previously he competed at the 2000 Summer Olympics, where he placed 29th.

References

1980 births
Living people
French male archers
Archers at the 2000 Summer Olympics
Archers at the 2004 Summer Olympics
Olympic archers of France
Sportspeople from Besançon
21st-century French people